{{Speciesbox
| image = 
| taxon = Hoplias microcephalus
| authority = (Agassiz, 1829)
| synonyms = * Erythrinus microcephalus Agassiz, 1829 It was listed as a valid species of Hoplias by O.T. Oyakawa in 2003.

References

External links
 Hoplias microcephalus at www.fishwise.co.za
 Hoplias microcephalus at ITIS

Erythrinidae
Fish of the São Francisco River basin
Taxa_named_by_Louis_Agassiz
Fish described in 1829